

Result of municipal elections
Results of the 1971 municipal elections.

References

Local elections in Norway
1970s elections in Norway
Norway
Local